Anthony Philip Corbeill is an American professor of Classics. He is currently the Basil L. Gildersleeve Professor of Classics at the University of Virginia. He was formerly a professor at the University of Kansas.

Academic history

Corbeill was born on 30 December 1960. He received his B.A. from the University of Michigan and his M.A. and Ph.D. in Classical Languages from the University of California at Berkeley in 1990. In addition, he has held fellowships working on the Thesaurus Linguae Latinae in Munich, Germany, the American Academy in Rome, the Institute for Research in the Humanities at the University of Wisconsin–Madison, and All Souls College, Oxford.

Work

Corbeill has published three books, Controlling Laughter. Political Humor in the Late Roman Republic (1996), Nature Embodied. Gesture in Ancient Rome (2004), and Sexing the World: Grammatical Gender and Biological Sex in Ancient Rome (2015). He is best known for his research concerning Roman literature and cultural history, as well as publishing articles concerning grammatical gender and gesture (such as the pollice verso, of which it has been argued that Corbeill "provides the most thorough review").

In January 2016, he won the Society for Classical Studies' Goodwin Award for his work on Sexing the World.

Bibliography

Corbeill has released the following books, all through Princeton University Press:

Controlling Laughter. Political Humor in the Late Roman Republic (1996) Princeton, NJ: Princeton University Press. .
Nature Embodied. Gesture in Ancient Rome (2004) Princeton, NJ: Princeton University Press. .
Sexing the World: Grammatical Gender and Biological Sex in Ancient Rome (2015) Princeton, NJ: Princeton University Press.

References

American classical scholars
Living people
Classical scholars of the University of Kansas
University of Michigan alumni
UC Berkeley College of Letters and Science alumni
Place of birth missing (living people)
Scholars of Latin literature
University of Kansas faculty
University of Virginia faculty
1960 births